Malak Khafagy (born 25 July 2004 in Alexandria) is an Egyptian professional squash player. As of March 2023, she was ranked number 89 in the world.

References

2004 births
Living people
Egyptian female squash players